Interleukin 1 receptor, type I (IL1R1) also known as CD121a (Cluster of Differentiation 121a), is an interleukin receptor. IL1R1 also denotes its human gene.

The protein encoded by this gene is a cytokine receptor that belongs to the interleukin-1 receptor family. This protein is a receptor for interleukin 1 alpha (IL1A), interleukin 1 beta (IL1B), and interleukin 1 receptor antagonist (IL1RA). It is an important mediator involved in many cytokine induced immune and inflammatory responses. This gene along with interleukin 1 receptor, type II (IL1R2), interleukin 1 receptor-like 2 (IL1RL2), and interleukin 1 receptor-like 1 (IL1RL1) form a cytokine receptor gene cluster in a region mapped to chromosome 2q12.

Interactions
Interleukin 1 receptor, type I has been shown to interact with PIK3R1, Myd88 and IL1RAP.

See also
 Cluster of differentiation
 Interleukin 1 receptor, type II

References

Further reading

External links
 

Clusters of differentiation